Le bruit de mon âme (literally "The Noise of My Soul") is the second studio album by French rapper Kaaris, it was released on 30 March 2015 by Therapy Music and Def Jam France.

Track list
"Kadirov" (3:07)
"Se-vrak" (4:14)
"Four" (3:53)
"80 ZETREI" (4:05)
"El Chapo" (feat. Lacrim) (5:12)
"Zone de transit" (3:45)
"Trap" (3:53)
"Crystal" (feat. Future) (4:53)
"Tripoli" (4:16)
"Magnum" (5:05)
"Vie sauvage" (feat. 13 Block) (5:14)
"Le bruit de mon âme" (4:54)
"Les oiseaux" (5:03)
"Mentalité cailleras" (4:20)
"Comme Gucci Mane" (4:09)
"Voyageur" (feat. Blacko) (3:00)
"Situation" (feat. Ixzo & Solo le Mythe) (5:09)
"Le temps" (3:37)

Charts

Weekly charts

Year-end charts

References

2015 albums
French-language albums